Kolathur is a village located in Kilpennathur Tehsil of Tiruvannamalai district in Tamil Nadu, India. Tiruvannamalai is the district and sub-district headquarters of Kolathur village. As per 2009 stats, Kolathur village is also a gram panchayat.

Kolathur has a total population of 2,160 people. There are about 530 houses in Kolathur.

Sub villages in Kolathur 
 Ponnankulam
 Erpakkam

Census - demographic data

Population 
 Total population - 3021
 Male - 1517
 Female - 1504

Child population(0-6 years) 
 Total - 336
 Male - 179
 Female - 157

Scheduled Caste population 
 Total - 781
 Male - 401
 Female - 380

Scheduled Tribe Population 
 Total - 13
 Male - 8
 Female - 5

Literates population 
 Total - 1744
 Male - 998
 Female - 746

Illiterates population 
 Total - 1277
 Male - 519
 Female - 758

Workers population 
 Total - 1749
 Male - 936
 Female - 813

Non-workers population 
 Total - 1272
 Male - 581
 Female - 691

Schools
 Government High School
 Government Elementary School
 Palvadi school

Tourist palace in Tiruvannamali District
Ramanar Ashram 
Javvadhu Hills
Parvadha Hills 
Sathanur Dam 
Shenbaga Thoppu Dam 
Vedhapurishwarar Temple, Cheyyar

Temple
 Arasumarathu Vinayagar Temple (Nadu Street)
 Muthalamman Temple (South Street)
 Kamatchi Amman Temple (South Street)
 Sri Maariyamman Temple (North Street)
 Kali Temple
 Ayyanar temple
 Putru Maariyamman Temple 
  (Earpakkam Lake)

Transport
 Public bus service - Available within village
 Private bus service - Available within village
 Railway station - Available within  distance

Villages in Tiruvannamalai district